Scott Lanaway is a music artist from Toronto, Canada. His most recent release was 'Mergers & Acquisitions' (2010), a follow-up to 'Answering Machine Diaries' (2006).  His musical style has been described as "electrofolk" - a combination of acoustic instruments and electronic soundscapes. It ranges from pop to cinematic/atmospheric.

'Mergers & Acquisitions' charted nationally on college radio across Canada. A video for the song '1333' was on MuchMusic, and the song 'Gabapentin' was featured nationally on CBC Radio3 and Sirius satellite radio in the summer of 2010. The album was critically well received.

Lanaway's music has been played nationally on CBC Radio 3 and college radio in Canada and the U.S..

He has also had his music placed regularly on network television in the U.S. (MTV, VH1, A&E).

References

MySpace

Canadian electronic musicians
Musicians from Toronto
Living people
Year of birth missing (living people)